Piscine and amphibian humanoids (people with the characteristics of fish or amphibians) appear in folklore and fiction.

Folklore

Myth

 Adaro from the mythology of the Solomon Islands
 Atargatis from Assyrian mythology
 Blue men of the Minch ("na fir ghorma": Scottish Gaelic pronunciation: [nə fiɾʲ ˈɣɔɾɔmə])
 Dagon, wrongly identified as a fish-god
 Ea from Babylonian mythology
 Glaucus, mortal transformed into a merman in Greek mythology
 Heqet, ancient Egyptian frog-headed goddess of fertility.
 Huh, ancient Egyptian frog-headed god whose name means "endlessness".
 Iara and Ipupiara from Brazilian mythology
 Mami Wata from the mythology of the Southern Africa
 Matsya, avatar of Vishnu in piscine form
 Nommo fish-like amphibian spirits in Dogon mythology.
 Oannes from Babylonian mythology
 Pania and Ponaturi from Māori mythology
 Pincoys and La Sirena chilota, princess of the sea from Chilote mythology
 Rusalki from Slavic mythology
 Siyokoy in Philippine mythology
 Triton, son of Poseidon
 Vodyanoy from Slavic mythology
 Yacuruna from the indigenous people of the Amazon

Legend
 The Amabie from Japanese folklore
 The ceasg in Scottish folklore
 Finfolk from the folklore of Orkney
 Kappa from Japanese folklore
 Melusine in European folklore
 The Neck from Scandinavian folklore
 The Ningyo from Japanese folklore
 Merrows from Irish folklore
 The Umibōzu from Japanese folklore
 Sirens, while initially described as birdlike, but have become associated with mermaids in later folklore.
 The Loveland Frogman.

Hoaxes
 Fiji mermaids, taxidermic hoaxes exhibited by P. T. Barnum and others

Fiction

Literature
 Grendel and Grendel's mother from Beowulf
 The Little Mermaid, from Hans Christian Andersen's Fairy Tales (1837)
 The underwater people from H. G. Wells's story "In the Abyss" (1896)
 The harbor master from Robert W. Chambers's story "The Harbor-Master" (1899)
 Mr. Toad from The Wind in the Willows (1908)
 The fish man from Irvin S. Cobb's story "Fishhead"  (1913)
 The Frogman, from L. Frank Baum's The Lost Princess of Oz (1917)
 Ichthyander from Alexander Belyayev's Amphibian Man (1928)
 The Deep Ones from H. P. Lovecraft's The Shadow Over Innsmouth (1936)
 The Newts from Karel Čapek's  War with the Newts (1936)
 Marsh-wiggles from  C. S. Lewis's The Silver Chair (1953)
 Swimmers from C. M. Kosemen's All Tomorrows (2006)

Comics
 The Fish Men from Buck Rogers comic strips
 The Shark Men from Flash Gordon comic strips
 Namor, the Sub-Mariner, from the Marvel Universe
 Aquaman from DC Comics
 The Water People from Carl Barks's story "The Secret of Atlantis"
 Frog-Man, and the Ani-Men version of Frog-Man, from Marvel Comics
 Abe Sapien and the "frog monsters" from the Hellboy comics
 Pepe the Frog, a comic character and Internet meme
 The Trench in DC Comics.

Films
 The frog people from The Mysterious Island (1929)
 The Gill-man from Creature from the Black Lagoon (1954)
 The Gill-man from The She-Creature (1956)
 The Gill-man from The Monster of Piedras Blancas (1958)
 The Gill-men from City Under the Sea (1965)
 The titular creatures from Humanoids from the Deep (1980)
 The aquatic aliens from The Abyss (1989)
 Chocki, the shark-man from Cabin Boy (1994)
 The "Mariner" from Waterworld (1995)
 The Gungans from Star Wars (1999)
 The Amphibian Man from The Shape of Water (2017)

Games
 The Argonians from Elder Scrolls
 Aulbath (a.k.a. Rikuo) from the video game series, Darkstalkers, by Capcom
 The Battletoads from the video game series of the same name
 Bullywug from the Dungeons & Dragons role-playing game setting
 The Rokea from the roleplaying game Werewolf: the Apocalypse
 The Sahuagin from the Dungeons & Dragons role-playing game setting
 The Salarians, a race in the Mass Effect series
 The Murloc are a species of amphibious creatures which live in tribes in World of Warcraft
 The Naga are a species of aquatic humanoids under the command and leadership of Queen Azshara in World of Warcraft
 The tritons from the Dungeons & Dragons role-playing game setting
 Zoras from The Legend of Zelda
 Cabal (Destiny), a turtle militarist race
 Neptuna, the mermaid-like boss in Croc: Legend of the Gobbos

Television
 The Aquaphibians from the Stingray TV series
 Molly, Gil, Goby, Deema, Oona and Nonny from Bubble Guppies
 The race of Cabira (one of Chilled's henchmen) is a race of fish-like humanoids from Dragon Ball
Crazy Frog
 The Fishmen are a race of fish-like humans from the anime One Piece. They are modeled after different aquatic lifeforms. The Fishmen can breed with Giants to create Wotans.
 Gill (aka Gil Moss) from "Kim Possible"
 Goo from Gumby
 The Sea Devils from Doctor Who
 Sil, from Doctor Who
 The TigerSharks in the cartoon series of the same name
 In the Dragon Ball Z series, the alien race of Sūi' (one of Frieza's foot soldiers) is a race of humanoid fish-like aliens, who worked in the Galactic Frieza Army
 The characters of Amphibia, a world of anthropomorphic frogs and other amphibians.
 Kermit the Frog and Robin the Frog from The Muppets
 Michigan J. Frog, star of the Looney Tunes short One Froggy Evening and onetime mascot of The WB
 The Hynerians from Farscape
 Some characters in Nagi-Asu: A Lull in the Sea are humans having the ability to breathe underwater (called Ena)
 The Kanassans are a race of fish-like humanoids from the planet Manassas. They are said to possess psychic abilities, including being able to read minds and see into the future. They featured in the special Dragon Ball Z: Bardock - The Father of Goku
 Mer-Man from the Masters of the Universe franchise
 The Fish People from the radio broadcast Alexei Sayle and the Fish People

See also
 Selkie
 Undine
 Jenny Haniver
 List of avian humanoids
 List of reptilian humanoids

References

 
 
 
-
Legendary amphibians
Legendary fish
Lists of fictional humanoid species